The 13th European Cross Country Championships were held at San Giorgio su Legnano in Italy on 10 December 2006. Mo Farah took the title in the men's competition, while Tetyana Holovchenko won the women's race.

Results

Men individual 9.95 km

 Fernando Silva (originally second place in 28:03) was disqualified for doping according to IAAF Rule 32.2.a.
Total 64 competitors

Men teams

Total 10 teams

Women individual 8.03 km

Total 59 competitors

Women teams

Total 9 teams

Men U23 individual 8.03 km

Men U23 teams

Women U23 individual 5.975km

Women U23 teams

Junior men individual 5.975km

Junior men teams

Junior women individual 4.1 km

Junior women teams

Medal table

References

External links 
 Database containing all results between 1994–2007

European Cross Country Championships
European Cross Country Championships
Cross country running in Italy
2006 in Italian sport
December 2006 sports events in Europe